Syzygium travancoricum is a species of plant in the family Myrtaceae. It is known from a few locations in Kerala and is endemic to India.  It is threatened by habitat loss.

Recent findings
Studies conducted by Kerala Forest Research Institute and MS Swaminathan Research Foundation found that the status of its endangered state can be upgraded as new sightings of the specimens are found elsewhere. In addition to that these two institutions are trying to propagate the tree in ecosystems where it can easily adapt and thrive.

References

Endemic flora of India (region)
travancoricum
Critically endangered plants
Taxonomy articles created by Polbot